Aharon ben Jacob Perlov of Karlin (1736 – 1772), known among the Ḥasidim as Rabbi Aharon the Great, or simply as the "Preacher" or "Censor", was one of the early rabbis of the sect who helped the rapid spread of Ḥasidism in Eastern Europe, and was distinguished for the fiery eloquence of his exhortations. He died one year before his master, Rabbi Dov Ber of Mezeritch, and was succeeded by his disciple, Rabbi Shlomo of Karlin. Rabbi Shlomo was in turn succeeded by Rabbi Aharon's son, Asher. 

Perlov composed and wrote the famous Sabbath hymn Yah Ekhsof (יה_אכסוף) which is still a part of the liturgy of the Ḥasidim. His ethical will and some collectables are printed in the work of his grandson, Aharon ben Asher of Karlin.

See also
 Karlin (Pinsk)
 Karlin-Stolin (Hasidic dynasty)

References

1736 births
1772 deaths
18th-century Polish–Lithuanian rabbis
Rebbes of Karlin–Stolin
Students of Dov Ber of Mezeritch